In mathematics, the classical groups are defined as the special linear groups over the reals , the complex numbers  and the quaternions  together with special automorphism groups of symmetric or skew-symmetric bilinear forms and Hermitian or skew-Hermitian sesquilinear forms defined on real, complex and quaternionic finite-dimensional vector spaces. Of these, the complex classical Lie groups are four infinite families of Lie groups that together with the exceptional groups exhaust the classification of simple Lie groups. The compact classical groups are compact real forms of the complex classical groups. The finite analogues of the classical groups are the classical groups of Lie type. The term "classical group" was coined by Hermann Weyl, it being the title of his 1939 monograph The Classical Groups.

The classical groups form the deepest and most useful part of the subject of linear Lie groups. Most types of classical groups find application in classical and modern physics. A few examples are the following. The rotation group  is a symmetry of Euclidean space and all fundamental laws of physics, the Lorentz group  is a symmetry group of spacetime of special relativity. The special unitary group  is the symmetry group of quantum chromodynamics and the symplectic group  finds application in Hamiltonian mechanics and quantum mechanical versions of it.

The classical groups
These groups are usually additionally restricted to the subgroups whose elements have determinant 1, so that their centers are discrete. The classical groups, with the determinant 1 condition, are listed in the table below. In the sequel, the determinant 1 condition is not used consistently in the interest of greater generality.

A group is complex according to whether its Lie algebra is complex. The real classical groups refers to all of the classical groups since any Lie algebra is a real algebra. The compact classical groups are the compact real forms of the complex classical groups. One characterization of the compact real form is in terms of the Lie algebra .

The classical groups can uniformly be characterized in a different way using real forms. The classical groups (here with the determinant 1 condition, but this is not necessary) are the following:
The complex linear algebraic groups , and  together with their real forms.
Without the determinant 1 condition, replace the special linear groups with the corresponding general linear groups in the characterization. The algebraic groups in question are Lie groups, but the "algebraic" qualifier is needed to get the right notion of "real form".

Bilinear and sesquilinear forms 

The quaternions, do not constitute a field because multiplication does not commute; they form a division ring or a skew field or non-commutative field. However, it is still possible to define matrix quaternionic groups.

 and if 

It is called sesquilinear if 
 and if

These conventions are chosen because they work in all cases considered.

This leads to a preliminary definition of a classical group:
This definition has some redundancy.

Symmetric, skew-symmetric, Hermitian, and skew-Hermitian forms
A form is symmetric if

It is skew-symmetric if

It is Hermitian if

Finally, it is skew-Hermitian if

A bilinear form  is uniquely a sum of a symmetric form and a skew-symmetric form. A transformation preserving  preserves both parts separately. The groups preserving symmetric and skew-symmetric forms can thus be studied separately. The same applies, mutatis mutandis, to Hermitian and skew-Hermitian forms. For this reason, for the purposes of classification, only purely symmetric, skew-symmetric, Hermitian, or skew-Hermitian forms are considered. The normal forms of the forms correspond to specific suitable choices of bases. These are bases giving the following normal forms in coordinates:

The pair , and sometimes , is called the signature of the form.

In the symmetric bilinear case, only forms over  have a signature. However, Hermitian forms have basis-independent signature in both the complex and the quaternionic case. (The real case reduces to the symmetric case.)

Automorphism groups

The first section presents the general framework.

Aut(φ) – the automorphism group
The automorphism group is defined, based on condition, as

Every  has an adjoint  with respect to  defined by

Using this definition in condition, the automorphism group is seen to be given by

In terms of this basis, put

This is appropriate for the bilinear forms. Sesquilinear forms have similar expressions and are treated separately later. In matrix notation one finds

and

from where  is the matrix . The non-degeneracy condition means precisely that  is invertible, so the adjoint always exists.  expressed with this becomes

The Lie algebra  of the automorphism groups can be written down immediately. Abstractly,  if and only if

for all , corresponding to the condition in  under the exponential mapping of Lie algebras, so that

or in a basis

as is seen using the power series expansion of the exponential mapping and the linearity of the involved operations. Conversely, suppose that . Then, using the above result, . Thus the Lie algebra can be characterized without reference to a basis, or the adjoint, as

The normal form for  will be given for each classical group below. From that normal form, the matrix  can be read off directly. This is demonstrated below in most of the non-trivial cases.

Bilinear case 
When the form is symmetric,  is called . When it is skew-symmetric then  is called . This applies to the real and the complex cases. The quaternionic case is empty since no nonzero bilinear forms exists on quaternionic vector spaces.

Real case
The real case breaks up into two cases, the symmetric and the antisymmetric forms that should be treated separately.

O(p, q) and O(n) – the orthogonal groups

If  is symmetric and the vector space is real, a basis may be chosen so that

The number of plus and minus-signs is independent of the particular basis. The matrix  is in this case

after reordering the basis if necessary. The adjoint operation then becomes

For example, the Lie algebra of the Lorentz group could be written as

Naturally, it is possible to rearrange so that the -block is the upper left (or any other block). Here the "time component" end up as the fourth coordinate in a physical interpretation, and not the first as may be more common.

Sp(m, R) – the real symplectic group

If  is skew-symmetric and the vector space is real, there is a basis giving

where . From the normal form one reads off

By making the ansatz

where  are -dimensional matrices and considering,

and the group is given by

Complex case
Like in the real case, there are two cases, the symmetric and the antisymmetric case that each yield a family of classical groups.

O(n, C) – the complex orthogonal group

If case  is symmetric and the vector space is complex, a basis

with only plus-signs can be used. The automorphism group is in the case of  called .

and the group is given by

Sp(m, C) – the complex symplectic group

For  skew-symmetric and the vector space complex, the same formula,

applies as in the real case. For  one writes .

and the group is given by

Sesquilinear case
In the sequilinear case, one makes a slightly different approach for the form in terms of a basis,

The other expressions that get modified are

The real case, of course, provides nothing new. The complex and the quaternionic case will be considered below.

Complex case 
From a qualitative point of view, consideration of skew-Hermitian forms (up to isomorphism) provide no new groups; multiplication by  renders a skew-Hermitian form Hermitian, and vice versa. Thus only the Hermitian case needs to be considered.

U(p, q) and U(n) – the unitary groups

A non-degenerate hermitian form has the normal form

As in the bilinear case, the signature (p, q) is independent of the basis. In this case,  takes the form

and the Lie algebra is given by

The group is given by

As a comparison, a Unitary matrix U(n) is defined as

We note that  is the same as

Quaternionic case 
This way,  for a quaternion , a quaternion column vector  and quaternion matrix . This does not correspond to the usual linear operation of a group on a vector space when a basis is given, which is matrix multiplication from the left on column vectors. The (mostly obvious) details are skipped because complex representations will be used.

When dealing with quaternionic groups it is convenient to represent quaternions using complex ,

With this representation, quaternionic multiplication becomes matrix multiplication and quaternionic conjugation becomes taking the Hermitian adjoint. Moreover, if a quaternion according to the complex encoding  is given as a column vector , then multiplication from the left by a matrix representation of a quaternion produces a new column vector representing the correct quaternion. This representation differs slightly from a more common representation found in the quaternion article. The more common convention would force multiplication from the right on a row matrix to achieve the same thing.

Quaternionic -matrices can, by obvious extension, be represented by  block-matrices of complex numbers. More formally

A matrix  has the form displayed in  if and only if . With these identifications,

The action of the quaternionic matrices on quaternionic vectors is now represented by complex quantities, but otherwise it is the same as for "ordinary" matrices and vectors. The quaternionic groups are thus embedded in  where  is the dimension of the quaternionic matrices.

The determinant of a quaternionic matrix is defined in this representation as being the ordinary complex determinant of its representative matrix. The non-commutative nature of quaternionic multiplication would, in the quaternionic representation of matrices, be ambiguous.

GL(n, H) and SL(n, H)
Under the identification above,

Its Lie algebra  is the set of all matrices in the image of the mapping  of above,

The quaternionic special linear group is given by

Alternatively, one can define this as the kernel of the Dieudonné determinant . The Lie algebra is

Sp(p, q) – the quaternionic unitary group
As above in the complex case, the normal form is

and the number of plus-signs is independent of basis. When  with this form, . The reason for the notation is that the group can be represented, using the above prescription, as a subgroup of  preserving a complex-hermitian form of signature  If  or  the group is denoted . It is sometimes called the hyperunitary group.

In quaternionic notation,

meaning that quaternionic matrices of the form

will satisfy

Now apply prescription to each block,

and the relations in  will be satisfied if

The Lie algebra becomes

The group is given by

Then

This means that

and this explains both the name of the group and the notation.

O∗(2n) = O(n, H)- quaternionic orthogonal group 
The normal form for a skew-hermitian form is given by

where  is the third basis quaternion in the ordered listing . From the normal form one sees that in quaternionic notation

and from  follows that

Now put 

according to prescription.

The Lie algebra becomes

and the group is given by

The group  can be characterized as

Then
 
The form  is Hermitian (while the first form on the left hand side is skew-Hermitian) of signature . The second form,  is symmetric positive definite. Thus, due to the factor ,  preserves both separately and it may be concluded that

and the notation "O" is explained.

Classical groups over general fields or algebras

Classical groups, more broadly considered in algebra, provide particularly interesting matrix groups. When the field F of coefficients of the matrix group is either real number or complex numbers, these groups are just the classical Lie groups. When the ground field is a finite field, then the classical groups are groups of Lie type. These groups play an important role in the classification of finite simple groups. Also, one may consider classical groups over a unital associative algebra R over F; where R = H (an algebra over reals) represents an important case. For the sake of generality the article will refer to groups over R, where R may be the ground field F itself.

Considering their abstract group theory, many linear groups have a "special" subgroup, usually consisting of the elements of determinant 1 over the ground field, and most of them have associated "projective" quotients, which are the quotients by the center of the group. For orthogonal groups in characteristic 2 "S" has a different meaning.

The word "general" in front of a group name usually means that the group is allowed to multiply some sort of form by a constant, rather than leaving it fixed. The subscript n usually indicates the dimension of the module on which the group is acting; it is a vector space if R = F. Caveat: this notation clashes somewhat with the n of Dynkin diagrams, which is the rank.

General and special linear groups

The general linear group GLn(R) is the group of all R-linear automorphisms of Rn. There is  a subgroup: the special linear group SLn(R), and their quotients: the projective general linear group PGLn(R) = GLn(R)/Z(GLn(R)) and the projective special linear group PSLn(R) = SLn(R)/Z(SLn(R)). The projective special linear group PSLn(F) over a field F is simple for n ≥ 2, except for the two cases when n = 2 and the field has order 2 or 3.

Unitary groups

The unitary group Un(R) is a group preserving a sesquilinear form on a module. There is a subgroup, the special unitary group SUn(R) and their quotients the projective unitary group PUn(R) = Un(R)/Z(Un(R)) and the projective special unitary group PSUn(R) = SUn(R)/Z(SUn(R))

Symplectic groups

The symplectic group Sp2n(R) preserves a skew symmetric form on a module. It has a quotient, the projective symplectic group PSp2n(R). The general symplectic group GSp2n(R)  consists of the automorphisms of a module multiplying  a skew symmetric form  by some invertible scalar. The projective symplectic group PSp2n(Fq) over a finite field is simple for n ≥ 1, except for the cases of PSp2 over the fields of two and three elements.

Orthogonal groups

The orthogonal group On(R) preserves a non-degenerate quadratic form on a module. There is a subgroup, the special orthogonal group SOn(R) and quotients, the projective orthogonal group POn(R), and the projective special orthogonal group PSOn(R). In characteristic 2 the determinant is always 1, so the special orthogonal group is often defined as the subgroup of elements of Dickson invariant 1.

There is a nameless group often denoted by Ωn(R) consisting of the elements of the orthogonal group of elements of spinor norm 1, with corresponding subgroup and quotient groups SΩn(R),  PΩn(R),  PSΩn(R). (For positive definite quadratic forms over the reals, the group Ω happens to be the same as the orthogonal group, but in general it is smaller.) There is also a double cover of Ωn(R), called the pin group  Pinn(R), and it has a subgroup called the spin group Spinn(R). The general orthogonal group GOn(R) consists of the automorphisms of a module multiplying a quadratic form by some invertible scalar.

Notational conventions

Contrast with exceptional Lie groups

Contrasting with the classical Lie groups are the exceptional Lie groups, G2,  F4,  E6,  E7,  E8, which share their abstract properties, but not their familiarity. These were only discovered around 1890 in the classification of the simple Lie algebras over the complex numbers by Wilhelm Killing and Élie Cartan.

Notes

References
E. Artin (1957) Geometric Algebra, chapters III, IV, & V via Internet Archive

Lie groups